Tlisi is a rural locality (a selo) in Tlibishinsky Selsoviet, Akhvakhsky District, Republic of Dagestan, Russia. The population was 211 as of 2010.

Geography 
Tlisi is located on the Chuandi River, 15 km southwest of Karata (the district's administrative centre) by road. Tlibisho is the nearest rural locality.

References 

Rural localities in Akhvakhsky District